Albert Lake is a natural lake in Douglas County, in the U.S. state of Minnesota. Albert Lake is a  protected lake.

History
Albert Lake was named for Ole Alberts, a pioneer farmer who settled there. Albert Lake is a natural environment lake which means structures built near the lake require special permits and setbacks, burn piles must be  from the lake and fertilizer may not be used near the lake.

See also
List of lakes in Minnesota

References

External links
 Albert Lake Topographical map
 Minnesota DNR "Lakefinder" Albert Lake

Lakes of Minnesota
Lakes of Douglas County, Minnesota